Sleepy Hollow, California may refer to:

Sleepy Hollow, Marin County, California
Sleepy Hollow, Chino Hills, California